is a Japanese actor. In 2013, he married actress Akiko Hinagata.

Filmography

Television

Films

Stage

Video games

Music videos

Discography 
 Eikyu Hozon Ban: Kamen Rider Zen Shudaika Shu (2007)
 Another (2006)
 A day in the life (2005)
 DEPARTURE (2005)
 TV Size! Saishin Kamen Rider Zen Shudaika Shu (2005)
 Kibogaoka (2005)
 Kamen Rider Blade The Last Card Complete Deck (2005)
 Kamen Rider Blade Song Collection (2004)
 Rebirth (2004) Kamen Rider Blade Theme Song

References

External links
Official site

1978 births
Japanese male television actors
Living people
People from Kasugai, Aichi
LDH (company) artists